The last great country swindle is the third solo album from Bendik Brænne. The album won Spellemannsprisen in 2017 for best Country album.

Track listing 
 "Runaway"
 "Ain't nobody like be"
 "Summerfiled"
 "I'll be gone tomorrow!"
 "Worries me"
 "Quick loving hearts"
 "I got (every thing but you)"
 "Close to the ground"
 "Sunshower"
 "Runaway" (outro)

Personnel 
 Daniel Romano – Guitar, back voc, synth, drums, co – producer
 Lars Erik Larsen – Bass, back voc, co – producer
 Kjetil Johan Jakobsen – drums, back voc
 Martin Windstad – Percussion
 David Wallumrød – Hammond Organ A-100, Piano
 Amund Maarud – guitar
 Bendik Brænne – vocals, piano, flute, engineer, producer, piano
 Eivind Solheim – trumpet
 Sindre Blostrupmoen – trumpet
 Mari Persen – strings
 Dan Weston – mix
 Greg Calbi – mastering

References

External links 
 
 
 

2017 albums
Bendik Brænne albums